MacKenzie Meehan is an American actress, known for The Wolf of Wall Street (2013), These Hopeless Savages (2014) and Couch Hoppers (2013). She was nominated for the Helen Hayes Awards for Outstanding Supporting Actress, Resident Play in 2011. She is an acting member of The Actors Company Theatre.

Meehan received her bachelor's degree from California State University and her MFA in acting from New York University.

Filmography

Films

Television and short

Award and nominations
 Helen Hayes Award 2011 - Outstanding Supporting Actress (Resident Play)

References

External links
 
 
 
 

Year of birth missing (living people)
Living people
21st-century American actresses
American film actresses
American stage actresses